Gasoline is an album by indie rock group the Hard Lessons, released by No Fun Records on May 28, 2005 (see 2005 in music).  It was received with generally favorable reviews.

Track listing
 "Feel Alright" - 3:58  
 "Milk and Sugar" - 4:28 
 "That Other Girl" - 3:22
 "Share Your Vanity" - 2:11
 "All Over This Town" - 3:52
 "Stop! Stop! Stop!" - 2:26
 "Feedback Loop" - 2:55
 "Inspired/Admired" - 2:35
 "How It Is With Me" - 2:48
 "I Can't Stand It" - 3:26
 "Love Gone Cold" - 4:15

Footnotes

2005 albums
The Hard Lessons albums